Water tree may refer to:

Electrical treeing
Grevillea berryana
Hakea leucoptera